Isle of Barra distillery at Borve, Barra, Scotland is a planned future whisky distillery on Barra. The Barra Distillery company was founded in 2003 but the distillery buildings are still to be constructed. However, wind turbines to power the distillery were installed in 2012  The distillery has become a Community Benefit Society, a vehicle to direct profits to support social and economic development in the community of Barra & Vatersay via a charitable trust. Shares are available to purchase, and it is expected that construction will commence before 2022.

Production is planned to commence as soon as construction is complete, with the first whisky going on sale after the legal minimum maturation of 3 years and 1 day.

The Isle of Barra Distillery is the trading name of Uisge Beatha nan Eilean Ltd., which has the same community benefit society legal structure as GlenWyvis Distillery (the first community distillery in Scotland).

See also
 Scotch whisky
 List of whisky brands
 List of distilleries in Scotland

References

External links
 www.uisgebeathananeilean.co.uk Official Webpage
  ScotchWhisky.com 2 April 2019
  Press & Journal 27 February 2019
  Stornoway Gazette 7 February 2019
  Official Webpage for GlenWyvis Distillery

2008 establishments in Scotland
Barra
Scottish malt whisky
Organisations based in the Outer Hebrides

Distilleries in Scotland